Jake Gelof (born February 25, 2002) is an American college baseball third baseman for the Virginia Cavaliers.

Amateur career
Gelof  grew up in Rehoboth Beach, Delaware and initially attended Cape Henlopen High School. He transferred to IMG Academy in Bradenton, Florida after his sophomore season. Gelof initially committed to play college baseball at William & Mary, but later flipped his commitment to Virginia. Gelof played summer collegiate baseball after graduating high school for the Brockton Rox of the Futures Collegiate Baseball League and hit for a .281 average with 19 RBIs.

Gelof became a starter at first base during his freshman season and batted .252 with 4 home runs and 15 RBIs. All four of his home runs were hit in postseason play. He played in the same infield as his older brother Zack Gelof as the team advanced to the 2021 College World Series. After the season, Gelof played for the Kalamazoo Growlers of the Northwoods League, where he batted .370. Gelof moved to third base prior to his sophomore season. He hit for the cycle on February 27, 2022, in a 19-1 win over Cornell, becoming the first Virginia player to do so in 21 years. He was named the Atlantic Coast Conference (ACC) Player of the Week the following day after going 9-10 during the series with four home runs and 15 RBIs. Midway through the season, Gelof was added to the watchlist for the Golden Spikes Award. He was named first team All-ACC at the end of the regular season after setting school records with 21 home runs and 81 RBIs. Gelof played for the Harwich Mariners of the Cape Cod Baseball League at the beginning of the following summer before being selected to play for the United States collegiate national team.

References

External links

Virginia Cavaliers bio

Living people
Baseball third basemen
Virginia Cavaliers baseball players
Baseball players from Delaware
2002 births
Harwich Mariners players
Brockton Rox players